The red-breasted coua (Coua serriana) is a species of cuckoo in the family Cuculidae.
It is endemic to Madagascar.

References

red-breasted coua
red-breasted coua
Taxonomy articles created by Polbot
Fauna of the Madagascar lowland forests
Endemic birds of Madagascar